"One for Sorrow" is a song by British pop-dance group Steps, released as the third single from their debut album, Step One (1998). It also became the quintet's first single to reach the top five on the UK Singles Chart. Debuting at number two and spending 11 weeks on the UK chart, the song established Steps's intention to revive the ABBA sound, striking a considerable resemblance to their 1980 hit "The Winner Takes It All". A remixed version became their debut US single in 1999 and was featured on the Drive Me Crazy film soundtrack. It became Steps' only single to appear on any US Billboard chart, peaking at number 38 on the Hot Dance Club Play chart in October 1999.

Release
Unlike Steps' previous single "Last Thing on My Mind", which featured solo vocals by all three girls, Claire performs lead vocals on all of the verses, which are harmonised with Faye, before the entire group join in for the chorus.

On 29 July 2015, Claire Richards premiered a new solo acoustic version of the track at an event celebrating Pete Waterman's career at the Royal Festival Hall. This was her first solo single, and was released the following day via her official SoundCloud.

Chart performance
"One for Sorrow" reached number two in the United Kingdom on 30 August 1998, during its first week on the UK Singles Chart, and spent 11 weeks on the listing. The song reached number one in the Flanders region of Belgium and entered the top 10 in Ireland as well as on the Eurochart Hot 100. Outside Europe, "One for Sorrow" peaked at number 13 in New Zealand, number 26 on the Canadian RPM Dance 30 chart, and number 34 in Australia. In the US, the song peaked at number 38 on the Billboard Dance Club Songs chart in October 1999—Steps' only single to appear on any Billboard ranking.

Critical reception
AllMusic editor Jon O'Brien described the song as "melancholic dance-pop". Lucas Villa from AXS noted that Richards "took the song's tragic wordplay to church in a powerhouse performance." He added that it "stands as one of Steps' finest pop moments." Larry Flick from Billboard wrote, "U.K. youth quintet Steps is all about conjuring up the timeless ABBA in its debut U.S. single, a joyous romp that will propel hands into the air and, with the proper push from Jive, send this song into the upper reaches of the pop charts—where it's already been across much of Europe. This U.S. mix is the tastiest kind of bubble gum, with a happy-go-lucky dance beat from production maestro Tony Moran; a solid, zippy vocal; and a sing-along chorus that sticks with maddening proficiency." A reviewer from Birmingham Evening Mail commented, "The nearest thing you'll get to an ABBA tribute song in the top ten. This sounds just like the Swedes around the time their complex inter-band relationships were hitting a rocky patch."

Can't Stop the Pop described "One for Sorrow" as a "brilliant moment in '90s pop music", adding that "this is pop music with a heart". They complimented Richard's vocals, stating that the track is "the perfect showcase for the power and range of her vocals." Scottish newspaper Daily Record stated, "It sounds like ABBA, but Steps prove they are the real thing with their biggest hit yet". Gary James from Entertainment Focus noted that "starting with the rain effect and gentle tickle of the piano, Claire’s voice tells the tale of wanting love but getting uncertainity [sic] as it builds to a big power chorus." Sunday Mirror commented, "Pop's next big things crank up the 
ABBA again minus the beards thankfully."

Music video
There were made two different music videos for the song; one for the European market and one for the US market. The first one was filmed in Italy. In the beginning, Claire performs alone inside a villa, standing by a window. Later the group performs in front of a field of sunflowers.

Track listings

 UK CD1 and Australian CD single
 "One for Sorrow" – 4:20
 "One for Sorrow" (instrumental) – 4:20
 "Too Weak to Resist" – 3:50

 UK CD2
 "One for Sorrow" – 4:20
 "One for Sorrow" (W.I.P. Remix) – 6:53
 "One for Sorrow" (acapella mix) – 4:16

 UK cassette single
 "One for Sorrow" – 4:20
 "One for Sorrow" (W.I.P. Remix) – 6:53

 European CD single
 "One for Sorrow" – 4:20
 "One for Sorrow" (instrumental) – 4:20

 US CD single
 "One for Sorrow" (US mix) – 3:30
 "One for Sorrow" (UK mix) – 4:22

 US 12-inch single
A1. "One for Sorrow" (Tony Moran's extended club) – 8:12
A2. "One for Sorrow" (original version) – 4:17
B1. "One for Sorrow" (Soul Solution extended vocal mix) – 5:05
B2. "One for Sorrow" (Pimp Juice's Summer Fung 12-inch) – 6:38

Credits and personnel

A-side: "One for Sorrow"
Credits are adapted from the liner notes of Step One.

Recording
 Recorded at PWL Studios, Manchester in 1998
 Mixed at PWL Studios, Manchester
 Mastered at Transfermation Studios, London

Vocals
 Lead vocals – Claire Richards
 Background vocals – Faye Tozer, Lisa Scott-Lee, Lee Latchford-Evans, Ian "H" Watkins

Personnel
 Songwriting – Mark Topham, Karl Twigg, Lance Ellington
 Production – Karl Twigg, Mark Topham, Pete Waterman
 Mixing – Les Sharma
 Engineer – Chris McDonnell
 Drums – Chris McDonnell
 Keyboards – Karl Twigg
 Guitars – Mark Topham, Barry Upton
 Banjo – Sean Lyons
 Violin – Chris Haigh

B-side: "Too Weak to Resist"
Credits are adapted from the liner notes of Step One.

Recording
 Recorded at PWL Studios, Manchester in 1998
 Mixed at PWL Studios, Manchester
 Mastered at Transfermation Studios, London

Vocals
 Lead vocals – Ian "H" Watkins
 Background vocals – Claire Richards, Faye Tozer, Lisa Scott-Lee, Lee Latchford-Evans

Personnel
 Songwriting – Dan Frampton
 Production – Dan Frampton, Pete Waterman
 Mixing – Dan Frampton
 Engineer – Dan Frampton, Chris McDonnell
 Drums – Pete Waterman
 Keyboards – Dan Frampton, Karl Twigg
 Guitars – Greg Bone

Charts and certifications

Weekly charts

Year-end charts

Certifications

Release history

References

1998 songs
1998 singles
Steps (group) songs
Jive Records singles
Pete Waterman Entertainment singles
Songs about heartache
Songs written by Lance Ellington
Songs written by Mark Topham
Songs written by Karl Twigg
UK Independent Singles Chart number-one singles